Aloidendron tongaense, formerly Aloe tongaensis, is a species of plant in the genus Aloidendron, native to sandy tropical coastal forests in KwaZulu-Natal, at the border between Mozambique and South Africa.

Description and taxonomy

It grows as a massive, branching tree, almost as tall as its larger and more widespread relative, the giant tree aloe Aloidendron barberae. It looks similar to A. barberae, however its leaves are slightly more yellow, and it produces bright red flowers.

References

Endangered flora of Africa
Flora of Mozambique
Trees of South Africa
Asphodeloideae